Sir Hector Munro, 2nd Baronet of Foulis (born August 1635) was a Scottish noble and clan chief of the highland Clan Munro. He is also by tradition the 20th Baron and 23rd overall chief of the clan. However, he is actually the 13th chief of the Clan Munro who can be proved by contemporary evidence.

Hector Munro, 2nd Baronet was the son of  the son of Sir Hector Munro, 1st Baronet and Mary Mackay, daughter of Hugh Mackay of Farr, Sutherland, chief of the Clan Mackay. Hector's father the 1st Baronet had died in 1635, the year Hector the 2nd Baronet was born and his more powerful cousins, the Munros of Obsdale and Munros of Lemlair were in majority.

Hector Munro, 2nd Baronet is said to have died aged just 17 in 1651. However, different sources give different details of the circumstances surrounding his death.

The Munro MS history written by George Martine between 1673 and 1697 states that Hector died at his uncle Donald Mackay, 1st Lord Reay's house in 1651, in Durness, Sutherland. However, Fraser's Wardlaw MS disagrees on the year of death and hints at "suspicion of mal[e]fice".  While Burke's Peerage and Baronetage has always stated that he died on his travels in Holland.

Whatever the fate of Sir Hector Munro, 2nd Baronet, he was succeeded in the chiefship of the Clan Munro in Ross-shire by his 2nd cousin Robert Munro of Obsdale who then became Sir Robert Munro, 3rd Baronet.

References

Notes

Hector Munro, 2nd Baronet
1635 births
Munro, Hector
Munro, Hector